Zizou Bergs was the defending champion but lost in the second round to Pavel Kotov.

Jesper de Jong won the title after defeating Marcelo Tomás Barrios Vera 6–1, 6–2 in the final.

Seeds

Draw

Finals

Top half

Bottom half

References

External links
Main draw
Qualifying draw

Almaty Challenger II - 1